The Torokina River is a river on Bougainville Island, within the Autonomous Region of Bougainville, in northeastern Papua New Guinea. 

See also

Rivers of Papua New Guinea
Geography of the Autonomous Region of Bougainville